Konstantin Vladimirovich Dyachenko (born 11 September 1975) is a former Russian professional football player.

Club career
He played two seasons in the Russian Football National League for FC Neftekhimik Nizhnekamsk and FC Uralan Elista.

References

1975 births
Sportspeople from Volgograd
Living people
Russian footballers
Association football midfielders
FC Energiya Volzhsky players
FC Elista players
FC Rotor Volgograd players
FC Mordovia Saransk players
FC Slavyansk Slavyansk-na-Kubani players
FC Tekstilshchik Kamyshin players
FC Neftekhimik Nizhnekamsk players
FC Spartak-MZhK Ryazan players